Antonio José Rodríguez Díaz (born 21 February 1992), known as Antonio Puertas, is a Spanish footballer who plays for Granada CF as a forward.

Club career
Born in Benahadux, Almería, Andalusia, Puertas finished his formation with UD Almería, after representing Los Molinos CF and Villarreal CF. He made his senior debuts with Polideportivo Ejido in 2011, in Segunda División B.

On 31 January 2012 Puertas moved to Granada CF, being assigned to the reserves, after Poli Ejido's dissolution. After scoring ten goals in 2013–14 he moved to another reserve team, UD Almería B also in the third level.

On 14 June 2015 Puertas was definitely promoted to the Rojiblancos' main squad in Segunda División. He made his professional debut on 9 September, coming on as a second-half substitute for José Ángel Pozo in a 3–3 Copa del Rey home draw against Elche CF (4–3 win on penalties).

Puertas made his debut in the second level on 11 October 2015, starting in a 1–1 away draw against Girona FC. He only scored his first professional goal on 3 September of the following year, netting the first in a 3–0 home win against Rayo Vallecano; he added another the following weekend, in a 3–3 draw at Girona.

On 16 June 2017 Puertas returned to Granada, signing a three-year contract and being assigned to the main squad also in the second tier. He scored a career-best ten goals during the 2018–19 campaign, as his side achieved promotion to La Liga.

Career statistics

Club

References

External links

1992 births
Living people
Sportspeople from the Province of Almería
Spanish footballers
Footballers from Andalusia
Association football forwards
La Liga players
Segunda División players
Segunda División B players
Tercera División players
Polideportivo Ejido footballers
Club Recreativo Granada players
UD Almería B players
UD Almería players
Granada CF footballers